Sir Proby Thomas Cautley, KCB (3 January 1802 – 25 January 1871), English engineer and palaeontologist, born in Stratford St Mary, Suffolk, is best known for conceiving and supervising the construction of the Ganges canal during East India Company rule in India.  The canal stretches some 350 miles between its headworks at Haridwar and, after bifurcation near Aligarh, its confluences with the Ganges river mainstem in Kanpur and the Yamuna river in Etawah. At the time of completion, it had the greatest discharge of any irrigation canal in the world.

Proby Cautley was educated at Charterhouse School (1813–18), followed by the East India Company's Military Seminary at Addiscombe (1818–19). After less than a year there, he was commissioned second lieutenant and dispatched to India, joining the Bengal Presidency artillery in Calcutta. In 1825, he assisted Captain Robert Smith, the engineer in charge of constructing the Eastern Yamuna canal, also called the Doab canal. He was in charge of this canal for 12 years between 1831 and 1843. By 1836, he was Superintendent-General of Canals.

Ganges canal

In 1840 Cautley reported on the proposed Ganges canal, for the irrigation of the country between the rivers Ganges, Hindan and Yamuna (then called the Jumna), which was his most important work. Cautley began working towards his dream of building a Ganges canal, and spent six months walking and riding through the area taking each measurement himself. He was confident that a 500-kilometre canal was feasible. There were many obstacles and objections to his project, mostly financial, but Cautley persevered and eventually persuaded the British East India Company to back him. This project was sanctioned in 1841, but the work was not begun till 1843, and even then Cautley found himself hampered in its execution by the opposition of Lord Ellenborough.

Digging of the canal began in April 1842. Cautley had to make his own bricks, brick kiln and mortar. Initially, he was opposed by the Hindu priests at Haridwar, who felt that the waters of the holy river Ganges would be imprisoned; but Cautley pacified them by agreeing to leave a gap in the dam from where the water could flow unchecked. He further appeased the priests by undertaking the repair of bathing ghats along the river. He also inaugurated the dam by the worship of Lord Ganesh, the god of good beginnings. Construction of the dam faced many complications, including the problem of the mountainous streams that threatened the canal. Near Roorkee, the land fell away sharply and Cautley had to build an aqueduct to carry the canal for half a kilometre. As a result, at Roorkee the canal is 25 metres higher than the original river. From 1845 to 1848 he was absent in England owing to ill-health, and on his return to India he was appointed director of canals in the North-Western Provinces. Over  in 5,000 villages were irrigated.

He was also instrumental in the establishment of the Roorkee college, named the Thomason College of Civil Engineering in 1854 and now known as IIT Roorkee. One of the twelve student hostels of IIT Roorkee is named after him.

Dehradun canal network

While the first canal in Dehradun was laid in the 17th century, Cautley significantly expanded the network in the 1850s. Five canals were laid in the city that irrigated the surrounding villages and produced a cooler microclimate. Since 2000, when the city became the state capital, most of the heritage canal network has been covered or demolished to expand the roads for ever-increasing traffic.

Fossil work
Cautley was actively involved in Dr Hugh Falconer's fossil expeditions in the Siwalik Hills. He presented a large collection of mammalian fossils, including hippopotamus and crocodile fossils indicating that the area had once been a swampland. Other animal remains that he found here included the sabre-toothed tiger, Elephis ganesa (an elephant with a trunk length of about 10 feet), the bones of a fossil ostrich and the remains of giant cranes and tortoises.

He also contributed numerous memoirs, some written in collaboration with Falconer, to the Proceedings of the Bengal Asiatic Society and the Geological Society of London on the geology and fossil remains of the Sivalik Hills.

Writings
Cautley's writings indicated his large and varied interests. He wrote on a submerged city, twenty feet underground, in the Doab: on the coal and lignite in the Himalayas; on gold washings in the Siwaliks, between the Sutlej and the Yamuna; on a new species of snake; on the mastodons of the Siwaliks and on the manufacture of tar.

In 1860 he published a full account of the making of the Ganges canal.

Awards and honours
In 1837, he received Wollaston medal of the Geological Survey of Great Britain.

The plant genus Cautleya is named in his honour.

A student hostel (Cautley Bhawan) in Indian Institute of Technology Roorkee is named after him.

Death
After the Ganges canal was opened in 1854 he went back to England, where he was made KCB, and from 1858 to 1868 he occupied a seat on the Council of India. He died at Sydenham, near London, on 25 January 1871.

Works
 (2 vols.)

Notes

References

 

British palaeontologists
English civil engineers
1802 births
1871 deaths
People from Babergh District
People educated at Charterhouse School
People from Haridwar
Members of the Council of India
Graduates of Addiscombe Military Seminary
Knights Commander of the Order of the Bath
Wollaston Medal winners
Bengal Artillery officers
Fellows of the Royal Society
British people in colonial India
Railway officers in British India